Serge Bélanger is a former politician in Montreal, Quebec, Canada. He was a member of the Montreal city council from 1975 to 1986 and served on the Montreal executive committee in the 1980s. Bélanger was a member of mayor Jean Drapeau's Civic Party of Montreal.

Bélanger was a building contractor in private life. He was first elected to city council in the 1974 municipal election for the Sainte-Marie division and was re-elected in 1978 and 1982. He served on the executive committee during the final years of Drapeau's administration.

Drapeau retired with the 1986 municipal election, in which the opposition Montreal Citizens' Movement (MCM) won a landslide majority on city council under Jean Doré's leadership. Bélanger was defeated by MCM candidate Serge Lajeunesse in Sainte-Marie. During this campaign, Lajeunesse accused Bélanger of attempting to scare voters in low-income neighbourhoods and retirement homes by claiming that municipal subsidies would be cut off in the event of a MCM victory. Bélanger denied the charge.

Bélanger was elected to the Civic Party executive in May 1989 as a supporter of the party's Drapeau-era establishment against internal reformers. He tried to return to council in the 1990 municipal election and finished third in the François-Perrault division against MCM candidate Vittorio Capparelli.

Bélanger was an ally of Liberal Member of Parliament (MP) Jean-Claude Malepart, who helped canvass for his municipal campaigns.

Electoral record

References

Montreal city councillors